Shively may refer to:

People
Benjamin F. Shively (1857–1916), American politician, Representative and Senator from Indiana
Donald Shively (1921–2005), academic, historian, and author
George Shively (1893–1962), Negro league baseball player
Gerald Shively (born 1962), American economist
Matt Shively (born 1990), American actor
Tom Shively (born 1946), member of the Missouri House of Representatives

Places
Shively, California, an unincorporated community
Shively, Kentucky, a city in the Louisville metropolitan area
Shively Field, a public airport near Saratoga, Wyoming